Luca Matranga (Albanian: Lekë Matrënga; 18 May 1569 – 6 May 1619) was an Arbëresh writer and Catholic priest of Byzantine rite in the Albanian community of Sicily. He is regarded as one of the most important authors of Albanian literature, as his work contains the oldest written text of Albanian in the diaspora.

Works
Matranga, who was born in Piana degli Albanesi, was the translator of a catechism book entitled E mbsuame e krështerë (Christian Doctrine) from Latin to medieval Albanian. The book was published in Rome, Italy, in the Greek college of St. Athanasios in 1592, and has 28 pages. The introduction of the book is in Italian. The book covers issues of the Christian doctrine. An eight-line poem of Matranga is also included in the book.

The importance of the book for Albanian literature remains both in the fact that it is the second major book published in Albanian and that the poem is the first form of poetry in Albanian found yet. His book, of which there are two copies, it is absolutely one of the first expressions of philological documented Albanian language in all Albanian literature. This book, E Mbësuame e Krështerë, has particular historical significance, linguistic and literary, being the oldest document in the toskë variant of Albanian literature.

Main works 
E Mbësuame e Krështerë / La Dottrina Cristiana Albanese (The Albanian Christian Doctrine), Piana degli Albanesi – Rome 1592.

Studies, transcripts and conferences on Luca Matranga 
Shkrimtari mâ i vjetri i italo-shqyptarvet: D. Lukë Matranga, 1592: copa të zgjedhuna e të komentueve per shkolla të mjesme, Skoder, print of Franciscan, 1931.
La Dottrina cristiana albanese di Luca Matranga : riproduzione, trascrizione e commento del codice Barberini latino 3454 / Luca Matranga, Vatican City, Biblioteca apostolica vaticana, 1964.
E mbsuame e Krështerë : Critical Edition of manuscripts and printed (1592) / Luke Matranga, curated by Matteo Mandalà, Caltanissetta-Palermo, S. Sciascia, 2004.

Notes and references

See also 
Arbëreshë people
Albanian Literature

External links 
Dottrina Cristiana or E mbsuame e Krështerë by Lëkë Matrënga – Michiel de Vaan
Verse of The Albanian Christian Doctrine

1567 births
1619 deaths
People from Piana degli Albanesi
Arbëreshë people
Latin–Albanian translators
Albanian-language writers